Maria Chatzinikolaou (born ) is a Greek female volleyball player, playing as a middle-blocker. She was part of the Greece women's national volleyball team. She competed at the 2001 Women's European Volleyball Championship.

Clubs
 Olympiacos (2006-2009)

References

External links
profile at greekvolley.gr
profile at worldofvolley.com

1978 births
Living people
Greek women's volleyball players
Olympiacos Women's Volleyball players
Panathinaikos Women's Volleyball players
Mediterranean Games silver medalists for Greece
Mediterranean Games medalists in volleyball
Competitors at the 2005 Mediterranean Games
Competitors at the 2009 Mediterranean Games
Volleyball players from Orestiada
21st-century Greek women